are curved, comma-shaped beads that appeared in prehistoric Japan from the Final Jōmon period through the Kofun period, approximately 1000 BCE to the 6th century CE. The beads, also described as "jewels", were made of primitive stone and earthen materials in the early period, but by the end of the Kofun period were made almost exclusively of jade.  originally served as decorative jewelry, but by the end of the Kofun period functioned as ceremonial and religious objects. Archaeological evidence suggests that  were produced in specific areas of Japan and were widely dispersed throughout the Japanese archipelago to the Southern Koreanic kingdoms via trade routes.

Jōmon period
 first appeared in Japan in the Final Jōmon period (1000–300 BCE), and in this period were made from relatively simple, naturally occurring materials, including clay, talc, slate, quartz, gneiss, jadeite, nephrite, and serpentinite.  from the Jōmon period were irregularly shaped, lacked continuity in form from region to region, and have been called "Stone Age " for this reason.  are thought to be an imitation of the teeth of large animals, pierced with a hole, which are found in earlier Jōmon remains. A "middle Jōmon exchange network" may have existed, whereby  were produced in regions where materials for their manufacture were readily plentiful. Jade and talc examples produced in bead-making villages located in present-day Itoigawa, Niigata have been found at a large number of sites along the northern coast, in the central mountains, and in Kantō region.

Archaeological sites (Jōmon)

Other sites associated with the Kamegaoka settlement have yielded , including the Ōboriya shell mound, in the northwest corner of Ōfunato Bay, which yielded a huge number of beads, as well as the Korekawa site, near Hachinohe, Aomori Prefecture. Remains from the Korekawa site can be seen at the Korekawa Archaeological Museum in Hachinohe. Stone and clay  and -like beads have also been discovered at the Amataki site, Ninohe, Iwate Prefecture, Osagata site, Ibaraki Prefecture, and the Kou site, Fujiidera, Osaka Prefecture. Numerous  at the Ōishi site, Bungo-ōno, Ōita Prefecture, Kyushu show signs of being used for ceremonial, rather than decorative, purposes.

Yayoi period

 in the Yayoi period (300 BCE – 300 CE) are notably different from Jōmon-period . The jewels moved from a primitive, non-standard form towards more polished and uniform form in this period. The technology to cut large gemstones and polish jewels notably advanced in the Yayoi period. Refined materials such as jadeite, serpentinite, and glass replaced the less sophisticated materials of the Jōmon period. Yayoi period  are noted for their reverse C-shaped form, which by the end of the period had become an almost squared shape. From the Yayoi period onwards,  uniformly feature a bored hole that allowed the jewels to be held on a string.

The period is marked by the formation of power centers that came to be individual states. The development of weapons increased in this period to protect increasingly developed rice fields and fishing rights. The necklace was typically constructed of jadeite  separated by cylindrical bored-holed pieces of jasper. Small beads of dark-blue glass are also not uncommon on the necklace. The bracelet typically also used shells from the coastal areas of Shikoku and the Inland Sea, wood, and bronze.

The Records of the Three Kingdoms, the earliest historical document with a reference to Japan, describes the Wa people, an ancient country of Yamatai, and its queen, Himiko. The Record indicates that when Himiko died, her relative Iyo, a girl of 13, was made queen and sent a delegation of twenty officials under Yazuku, an imperial general, to offer tribute to the Northern Wei court. "The delegation visited the capital and offered to the court five thousand white gems and two pieces of carved jade, as well as twenty pieces of brocade with variegated designs." The carved jade in the Record likely describes a tribute of two jade .

Archaeological sites (Yayoi)

The large-scale Yayoi period remains at the Yoshinogari site, Yoshinogari and Kanzaki in Saga Prefecture revealed examples of lead glass  typical of the Yayoi period. In 2003, the excavation of a large Yayoi period settlement in Tawaramoto, Nara also revealed two large jade , one , the second  in length. The larger Tawaramoto  is the 10th-largest example found to date in Japan. Both jade  from the site are of unusually high-quality brilliant green jade.

One known center of Yayoi  production was in the area of the Tamatsukuri Inari Shrine in Osaka.  literally means "jewel making", and a guild, the Tamatsukuri-be, was active from the Yayoi period. An existing jewel at the shrine is said to have great spiritual power.  appear on all sorts of implements of the present-day temple, including amulets, roof tiles, and lanterns.

Kofun period

 became very common in the Kofun period (250–538 CE), and by the end of the period almost all  tumuli contained . In the early Kofun period,  were made from jadeite as in earlier periods, but by the middle of the period were made from jasper, and by the end of the period, almost exclusively of agate and jade.  capped by silver or gold also appear towards the end of the period. Large  made of talc, imitations of smaller ones made of more precious materials, were used as grave goods.  are found in  tumuli across Japan from the period. These first appear in the Kofun period. Also in the Kofun period,  appear on necklaces, with several  set between bored cylinders. Archeological remains show evidence of similar ankle bracelets, but they are less common. Clay  funerary objects of the Kofun period commonly depict people wearing the necklaces and ankle bracelets.

Archaeological sites (Kofun)
Examples of stone  from the Kofun period are especially numerous. An excavation of the Kamegaoka , Kishiwada, Osaka, revealed a local who had been buried with a jade, jasper, and alabaster  necklace, as well as  placed near the feet. A bronze mirror imported from China accompanying the burial was dated to 239 CE. The  is a Designated Historical Spot of the city of Kishiwada. Ceremonial offerings from a burial from the Kisami-Araida area of Shimoda, Shizuoka also revealed clay reproductions of  used as effigies.

The large Muro Miyayama  of Katsuragi, Nara, on the Yamato Plain,  in length, was plundered long before its excavation, but revealed 600 talc ceremonial  among other funerary objects, which also included 10 bronze Han Chinese mirrors. The Hiraide remains of Shiojiri, Nagano, one of the three largest prehistoric sites in Japan, and far from any regional power center, includes typical Kofun period remains, but also objects associated with modern Shinto ceremonial practice. Nevertheless,  in Hiraide reveal both plain and elaborate  among other funerary objects.

Among the very large number of funerary objects were high-quality weapons, including swords, 10 mirrors, and a necklace of jadeite , agate cylinders, and glass beads used to make a -style necklace.

Origin of magatama forms 
Archaeologists and historians are unable yet to explain what the origins of  forms are, or whether these forms can be traced back to one convergent source. A number of explanations have been suggested, including:

 They may be fashioned after animal fangs/teeth
 They may be modeled after the shape of fetuses
 They may be symbolic of the shape of the soul
 They may be modeled after the shape of the moon
 That there is meaning and connotation attached to the shape of the  itself (i.e. meaning comes from the form itself, and not that  has been patterned after anything else)

In Japanese mythology

Susanoo, god of the sea and storms, received five hundred  from Tamanoya no mikoto, or Ame-no-Futodama-no-mikoto, the jewel-making deity. In the legend Amaterasu later shuts herself in a cave. Ama-no-Koyane-no-mikoto hung , among other objects, on a five hundred-branch  tree, to successfully lure Amaterasu from the cave. This  was presented to Suinin, who enshrined it at Isonokami Shrine, where it is said to presently reside. A similar practice is described again in the  during the reign of the Emperor Chūai.

Yasakani no Magatama 
Swords, mirrors, and jewels were common objects of status for regional rulers in Japan as early as the Yayoi period, and were further widespread in the Kofun period, as shown by their ubiquitous presence in kofun tumuli.

Replicas of the sword and mirror were made as early as the 9th century, and the originals were entrusted to other shrines.

Usage in Ryūkyūan religion

D. C. Holtom stated that  priestesses of the Ryukyu Kingdom wore  necklaces early in the 20th century for ceremonial purposes, but provides no other details.

See also
  – a similarly shaped jewel found in the Korean Peninsula.
 Lingling-o – similarly shaped jade, wood, or metal pendants from various ancient Austronesian cultures.
  – a wish-fulfilling jewel within both Hindu and Buddhist traditions, said by some to be the equivalent of the philosopher's stone in Western alchemy. It is one of several Mani Jewel images found in Buddhist scripture.  
 Pig dragon or  – zoomorphic stone artifacts produced in neolithic China with a similar c- or comma-like shape.

References

Archaeological cultures of East Asia
Archaeology of death
Archaeology of Japan
Beadwork
Hardstone carving
Japanese monarchy
Japanese words and phrases
Jōmon period
Kofun period
Mounds
Shinto religious objects
State ritual and ceremonies
Amulets
Talismans
Magic items
Yayoi period